David Clarinval (born 10 January 1976) is a Belgian politician of the Reformist Movement who has been serving as Minister of the Middle Class, SMEs, Self-employed, Agriculture, Social Integration and Urban Policy in the government of Prime Minister Alexander De Croo since 2020.

Early life
Clarinval was born on 10 January 1976 in the town of Dinant. He studied political science at Université catholique de Louvain. After graduation, he served as an assistant to the Mouvement Réformateur in the Chamber of Representatives.

Political career
In the 2000 Belgian local elections, at age 24, Clarinval was elected mayor of the town of Bièvre. At the time, he was the youngest mayor in the country.

Clarinval has been a member of the Chamber of Representatives of Belgium since 2007. On 27 October 2019, he was appointed by Prime Minister Sophie Wilmès as the Minister of Budget and Public Service and Minister for Science Policy. In November, he was appointed as one of three Deputy Prime Ministers, replacing Didier Reynders.

With the gradual withdrawal of Sophie Wilmès from the government, Clarinval became Deputy Prime Minister in April 2022, initially on a provisional basis and definitively from July 14, 2022.

References 

1976 births
Members of the Chamber of Representatives (Belgium)
Reformist Movement politicians
Living people